The SR-50 was Texas Instruments' first scientific pocket calculator with trigonometric and logarithm functions. It enhanced their earlier SR-10 and SR-11 calculators, introduced in 1973, which had featured scientific notation, squares, square root, and reciprocals, but had no trig or log functions, and lacked other features. The SR-50 was introduced in 1974 and sold for US$170. It competed with the Hewlett-Packard HP-35.

Design
The SR-50 measured 5-3/4 inches long by 3-1/8 inches wide by 1-3/16 inches high (147 mm by 78 mm by 31 mm) and was powered by a rechargeable NiCad battery pack, built from three soldered AA cells. It had 40 keys, and flat sliding switches for degrees/radians and on/off. "SR" stood for "slide rule."

The SR-50 had a red LED display with a signed ten-digit mantissa plus a signed two-digit exponent for floating point numbers (negative values were indicated with a leading minus sign and positive values with no sign). Internally, calculations were performed with a 13-digit mantissa, providing much greater calculation accuracy than the 10-digit precision of most scientific calculators of the time.  After the leading sign, digits consisted of a seven-segment display plus decimal point. A blinking display indicated an error, such as a calculation error or an overflow or underflow condition. 

Like most scientific calculators, the SR-50 mostly used ordinary infix notation, as opposed to the postfix Reverse Polish Notation (RPN) employed by its competitor, the Hewlett Packard HP-35. The SR-50 followed the standard order of operations by performing unary (single-argument) operations (reciprocal, square, square root, log, trig and hyperbolic trig functions) immediately, and multiplication, division, root, and power operations before addition and subtraction operations. But: you had to enter parameters first when using single-argument operations (e. g. 30 sin). As an example, the keypresses to calculate "3 x log(4) + 5" was entered almost as written, namely "3 x 4 log + 5 =". This is because the calculator would execute the log function before performing the multiplication operation, and complete the multiplication operation before executing the addition operation. It did so by having unary operations operate on the X register, addition and subtraction operate on the X and Z registers, and multiplication, division, power, and root functions operate on the X and Y registers in its operational stack.

An unusual feature of the SR-50 was that its included functions like factorial and hyperbolic trig functions, which were found on very few calculators (including the HP-35 and HP-45) at the time. The user invoked the hyperbolic functions by entering the function argument and then pressing the "hyp" key, followed by the "sin", "cos", or "tan" function key. The inverse hyperbolic functions were accessed by first pressing the "arc" and "hyp" keys (in any order) and then pressing the "sin", "cos", or "tan" key. Hyperbolic trig arguments were always assumed to be in radians regardless of the setting of the degree/radian (D/R) mode switch. In addition to its three-register operational stack, consisting of X, Y, and Z registers, the SR-50 also included one memory (M) register to which the value in the X (display) register could be directly added using the "summation" key.  The SR-50 had very fast trig functions (about half a second to evaluate each function) and was a popular calculator to use in contests involving pocket calculators.

Technical data 
 ALU (Arithmetic and Logic Unit): TMC0501
 SCOM (Scanning Read Only Memory): TMC0521
 Display driver: 2 × 27882
 Power: NiCd battery pack BP1 (3,6 V), charger AC9200 or AC9900

Descendants
The SR-50 was followed by the more advanced model SR-51. The SR-51 had the same physical dimensions but added a 2nd function for most buttons. Most notable among the added functions were the ability to enter x:y pairs and do linear regression analysis on them. The later and lighter versions SR-50A and SR-51II and SR-51III were based on smaller ICs and battery packs and reached broadest distribution.

A further update resulted in the programmable model SR-52 in late 1975. It was thicker and longer and could perform 224 program steps recorded on magnetic cards, similar to its competitor HP-65.  The card was pulled through the reader by an electric motor.  The matte white upper face of the cards could be marked with pen or pencil to indicate the program and the functions assigned to the calculator's programmable keys.  The card could be stored in a slot above the programmable keys with its markings visible. 

In 1976 Texas Instruments released the TI-30 budget calculator at one-third the price of the SR-50, so sales of the SR-50 quickly dropped.

References

Texas Instruments calculators